"What You Won't Do for Love" is a song by American singer-songwriter Bobby Caldwell. It was released in September 1978 as the lead single from his eponymous debut album. It was written by Caldwell and Alfons Kettner, and produced by Ann Holloway.  The song has been covered and sampled numerous times, including by Tupac Shakur in the posthumous 1998 hit "Do for Love".

Background and release
After gaining a reputation in Miami clubs as a talented musician, Caldwell was signed to an exclusive contract with TK Records in 1978 by TK Records president Henry Stone. Heading to the studio, Caldwell recorded his first album, which was given a redo after Stone felt the album was good but "didn't have a hit". Caldwell returned to the studio and came up with the final product, which included "What You Won't Do for Love".  The song's horn arrangement was written and recorded by Miami arranger Mike Lewis. The song is in the key of F-sharp minor (although the pitch of the commercial track is slightly flat - i.e. below concert pitch - perhaps due to tape machine speed variation).

Caldwell wanted the song to be the sixth track on the album since he figured his debut album's second track, "My Flame", which featured him playing guitar, would be the hit. However, TK Records felt confident that "What You Won't Do for Love" would be the breakout hit. When it was released to R&B radio, TK Records did their best to hide Caldwell's racial identity, hoping not to alienate their predominantly African American audience. However, when Caldwell began making performances live on stage, demand only increased.

Chart performance
The song would become Caldwell's most successful single and also his signature song, reaching number 9 on the Billboard Hot 100, number 6 on the Hot Selling Soul Singles chart, and number 10 on the Easy Listening chart. In Canada the song reached number 16 on the pop charts, and number 24 on the AOR charts.

According to the broadcast of American Top 40 for the week ending February 3, 1979, the week in which the song debuted at No. 38 on the Top 40, a heart-shaped pressing of the single was the most expensive single up to that point.  The heart-shaped single was originally released as a promotional item only, but public demand led to 50,000 copies being pressed in time for Valentine's Day 1979 with a retail price of $7.98—about the price of a full LP album at the time.

After Caldwell's death on March 14, 2023, "What You Won't Do for Love" saw an increase in popularity. In the United Kingdom, the song charted at number 86 on the Singles Downloads Chart Top 100 on March 17, 2023.

Personnel
 Bobby Caldwell – lead and backing vocals, keyboards, bass guitar
 Benny Latimore – keyboards
 Alfons Kettner – guitar
 Joe Galdo - drums
 Steve Mele – guitar

Chart history

Weekly charts

Year-end charts

Covers and samples

Tupac Shakur 
Sampled "What You Won't Do for Love" on his track "Do for Love" in 1994; the single was released in 1998.

Natalie Cole/Peabo Bryson 
Performed as a duet on their 1979 album We're the Best of Friends.

Roy Ayers 
American jazz-funk composer and producer released a version on his 1979 album No Stranger to Love.

Phyllis Hyman 
Phyllis Hyman, American singer, songwriter, and actress released her version on her 1986 album "Living All Alone".

Dorothy Moore 
Dorothy Moore American Blues, R&B,And Gospel Singer released a version of "What You Won't Do For Love" on her 1992 album, "Stay Close To Home" on Malaco Records

Charts

Go West 
English pop duo Go West recorded a version on their third studio album, Indian Summer (1992), and released it as a single on January 4, 1993.

Weekly charts

Year-end charts

Victor Wooten 
Bassist Victor Wooten recorded an instrumental version on his 1997 studio album What Did He Say?.

Michael Bolton 
Michael Bolton recorded a version on his 1999 covers album Timeless: The Classics Vol. 2.

Boyz II Men 
The vocal group Boyz II Men released a cover of the song on their 2004 album Throwback, Vol. 1, featuring rapper MC Lyte.

Charts

Jessie Ware 

Jessie Ware covered the song on her iTunes Gold Special Edition release 2013 album “Devotion.”

Snoh Aalegra 

Snoh Aalegra released a cover of the song under the title "DO 4 LOVE" as a Spotify Single in October 2019.

Commercial use
The song was featured in a 2014 commercial for the Mitsubishi Outlander Sport.

References 

1978 debut singles
2004 songs
Boyz II Men songs
Songs written by Bobby Caldwell
Bobby Caldwell songs
1978 songs
1992 singles
Go West (band) songs
Chrysalis Records singles
TK Records singles
Blue-eyed soul songs
Phyllis Hyman songs
Peabo Bryson songs
Natalie Cole songs
Jessie Ware songs
Sampha songs
1970s ballads
Soul ballads